United States v. Maine, 469 U.S. 504 (1985), also known as the Rhode Island and New York Boundary Case, was a decision by the U.S. Supreme Court, which held that the Long Island Sound and Block Island Sound in part constitute a juridical bay under Article 7(6) of the Convention on the Territorial Sea and the Contiguous Zone, Long Island being an extension of the mainland and the southern headland of the bay, and (b) that the bay closed at the line drawn from Montauk Point at the eastern tip of Long Island to Watch Hill Point on the Rhode Island shore, the waters of the bay west of the closing line being internal state waters, and the waters of Block Island Sound east of that line being territorial waters and high seas. Maine is named in the title of the case because it is the northernmost of the thirteen defendant states with coastline on the Atlantic Ocean in a series of cases related to overlapping claims of state and federal jurisdiction over seas and the seafloor.

The federal government and states didn't agree on who controlled the Long Island and Block Island sounds. The states wanted control to regulate shipping and commerce on the sounds. The key to the case was if Long Island was, for legal purposes, an extension of the mainland or an island. If it were simply an extension of the mainland, as the states argued, then the sounds would legally be inland bays controlled by the states. If it were, for legal purposes, an island, then the sounds would be considered open waters and be under federal control. 

The court ruled in favor of the states, determining that the East River, which separates Long Island from the mainland, was too shallow for safe ship passage until humans widened it. Thus, it was decided that Long Island is not a natural island. Long Island and the adjacent shore also share a common geological history.

See also
 List of United States Supreme Court cases, volume 469
 List of United States Supreme Court cases
 Lists of United States Supreme Court cases by volume
 List of United States Supreme Court cases by the Rehnquist Court

External links 
 

United States Supreme Court cases
United States Supreme Court cases of the Burger Court
United States Supreme Court original jurisdiction cases
1985 in United States case law
1985 in Maine
1985 in New York (state)
Internal territorial disputes of the United States